Qassim University is a major public university in Saudi Arabia. The main campus of Qassim University covers about eight square kilometers in the heart of the region. Qassim University has over 38 Colleges, offering over 30 PhD, 70 master's, 120 Bachelor's and diploma degrees. Qassim University has over 50,000 students. 6000 Faculty and staff members. During 2016/2017 academic year, 7019 male and 9692 female students were newly enrolled at Qassim University. Qassim University is among the top 7 Saudi universities. In 2015, QS ranked Qassim University as 46 among Arab Region Rankings.

Colleges at Qassim University include Sharia College; the College of Arabic Language and Social Sciences; the College of Agricultural and Veterinary Sciences; a College of Economics; a College of Science; a College of Medicine; a College of Engineering; a College of Computer; a College of Applied Medical Sciences; a College of Dentistry and a College of Pharmacy.

There is also a Science College in Al-Zilfi, community colleges.

Location
The main campus is located in the middle of Al-Qassim Province in Mulaida outskirt area 15 km west of Buraydah beside Saudi Aramco (Qassim Branch) and Prince Nayef bin Abdulaziz international Airport. Sub-campuses are sited and also There are colleges scattered in several other cities of province.

Qassim University (QU) appeared in the QS World University Rankings for the first time in 2011. According to the QS report, it has shown excellent potential for strengthening its position by harnessing its core strengths in teaching and Research. QU has published Research papers with institutions ranked in top 100 of the 2011 rankings. QU has also shown initiative in arranging International Seminars in order to develop relations with global academic peers. Qassim Universities has very competitive colleges that are spread at the main campus and Branch in Al-Qassim's other cities.

In November 2015, AACSB has announced that Qassim University has earned accreditation for its College of Business and Economics (CBE), which is according to the new standards of AACSB, Innovation, Engagement and Impact. AACSB stands for Association to Advance Collegiate Schools of Business. It was founded in 1916 and it is the longest serving global accrediting body for business schools that offer undergraduate, master's, and doctorate degrees in business and accounting. AACSB Accreditation is the hallmark of excellence in business education, and has been earned by less than five percent of the world's business programs.

Sport activities
Al-Qassim Universities hosts many sport activities and sport teams that compete at the national level in Saudi Arabia and in the GCC region. The football team has won the national universities competition 2 years in a row, 2014 and 2015. The university sports teams includes volleyball, swimming, athletics and many more.

Accreditations

ABET:
Qassim Engineering College EE, CE, and ME B.Sc. programs delivered on the main campus are accredited by the ABET (EAC).
Also College of computer has been accredited by ABET.

QS Benchmarking:
Qassim University is currently being benchmarked by QS against its national and international peers. The benchmarking provides a detailed map of the university's strengths and weaknesses in various academic markers.

NCAAA:
Qassim University is currently undergoing the accreditation process by National Commission for Academic Accreditation and Assessment (NCAAA).

ASIIN e.V :
Qassim University is also undergoing the certification of quality management systems in systems accreditation.

COE:
Community College in Buraidh obtained the accreditation from The Council on Occupational Education (COE) in July 2012.

Colleges

Main campus 
Preparatory Year Unit
College of Engineering
College of Agriculture and Veterinary
College of Medicine
College of Dentistry
College of Applied Medical Science
College of Computer
College of Pharmacy
College of Nursing
College of Management and Economics
College of Architecture and Planning
College of Sciences
College of Islamic Law Sharia & Religion Principles
College of Arabic Language and Humanities
College of Education

Sub-campuses

College of Science in Zelfi
Community College in Buraydah center.
College of Science and Arts in Buraydah center.
College of Home Design in Buraydah center.
College of Medical Rehabilitation in Buraydah center.
Community College in Unaizah
College of Medicine and medical science Unaizah
College of Health Sciences Unaizah
College of Engineering Unaizah
College of Science and Arts Unaizah
College of Science and Arts Ar Rass
College of Health Sciences Ar Rass
College of Science and Arts Al-Bukairiyah
College of Health Sciences Al-Bukairiyah
College of Science and Arts Al-Methnab
College of Science and Arts Oqlat-Assogoor
 College of Science and Arts ( Al- Badayea)

Women Colleges

Faculty of Dentistry
Faculty of Applied Medical Sciences (a subsidiary of the main campus).
Faculty of Pharmacy (a subsidiary of the main campus).
Computer College (a subsidiary of the main campus).
College of Human Medicine (a subsidiary of the main campus).
College of Business (a subsidiary of the main campus).
Faculty of Health Sciences for Girls in Buraidah (in preparation)
Faculty of Health Sciences for Girls in Onaizah (in preparation)
College of Education for Girls in Buraidah (Psychology - Special Education - kindergarten)
Faculty of Arts and Sciences in Buraidah (English Literature - Arabic language - Islamic Studies - Computer - Preparation of Natural Sciences)
Faculty of Arts and Sciences in Onaizah (English Literature - Arabic language - Islamic Studies - Preparation of Natural Sciences)
Faculty of Arts and Sciences in Rass (English Literature - Arabic language - Islamic studies - studies the Koran - Computer Sciences - the preparation of Natural Sciences)
Faculty of Arts and Sciences in Al-Bukairiyah (English Literature - Arabic language - Preparation Natural Sciences)
Faculty of Science and Arts in Oqlat-Assogoor (English Literature - Arabic language - Preparation Natural Sciences)
Faculty of Arts and Sciences in the Muznib (Computer Science - English - Islamic Studies -Mathematics - Physics)
Faculty Design and Home Economics in Buraidah (Nutrition and Food Science - Art Education - Fashion Design)
Faculty of Arts and Sciences in Riyadh Al Khabra (Physics - Mathematics - Kindergarten)
 Faculty of Arts and Science in Al-Badayea ( English - Mathematics- Physics)

References

External links

Qassim University College of Medicine
Teaching Jobs in Saudi Arabia

2004 establishments in Saudi Arabia
Educational institutions established in 2004
Universities and colleges in Saudi Arabia
Buraidah